Kumarapattiya is a settlement in Badulla District, Uva Province, Sri Lanka.

References 

Populated places in Badulla District